is a Japanese animation studio that was rebranded from A-1 Pictures' Kōenji Studio. It is a subsidiary of Sony Music Entertainment Japan's anime production firm Aniplex.

Establishment
On April 1, 2018, A-1 Pictures rebranded its Kōenji Studio as CloverWorks, which has a unique brand identity, distinguishable from its main Asagaya Studio. The studio is based in Suginami, Tokyo.

Four anime productions have changed the studio credited from A-1 Pictures to CloverWorks after the rebranding. They are Slow Start, Darling in the Franxx, Persona 5: The Animation and Ace Attorney Season 2. Slow Start changed the credited studio after the original run ended, while Darling in the Franxx changed the credited studio during production.

On October 1, 2018, CloverWorks announced that it had separated from A-1 Pictures, although it remained as a subsidiary of Aniplex.

Works

Television series

Films

ONAs/OVAs

Notes

References

External links

  
 

 
Animation studios in Tokyo
Japanese animation studios
Japanese companies established in 2018
Mass media companies established in 2018
Suginami
Corporate spin-offs